The 100 meter running deer, double shots was a shooting sports event held as part of the Shooting at the 1920 Summer Olympics programme. It was the third appearance for the event. The competition was held on 27 July 1920. 8 shooters competed from 3 nations competed.

Results

References

External links
 Official Report
 

Shooting at the 1920 Summer Olympics
100 meter running deer at the Olympics